Ghost Town(s) or Ghosttown may refer to:

 Ghost town, a town that has been abandoned

Film and television
 Ghost Town (1936 film), an American Western film by Harry L. Fraser
 Ghost Town (1956 film), an American Western film by Allen H. Miner
 Ghost Town (1988 film), an American horror film by Richard McCarthy (as Richard Governor)
 Ghost Town (2008 film), an American fantasy comedy film by David Koepp
 Ghost Town, a 2008 TV film featuring Billy Drago
 Derek Acorah's Ghost Towns, a 2005–2006 British paranormal reality television series
 "Ghost Town" (CSI: Crime Scene Investigation), a 2009 TV episode

Literature
 Ghost Town (Lucky Luke) or La Ville fantôme, a 1965 Lucky Luke comic
Ghost Town, a Beacon Street Girls novel by Annie Bryant
Ghost Town, a 1998 novel by Robert Coover
Ghosttown, a 2007 novel by Douglas Anne Munson

Music
 Ghost Town (band), an American electronic band
 Ghost Town, a 1939 ballet by Richard Rodgers

Albums
 Ghost Town (Bill Frisell album) or the title song, 2000
 Ghost Town (Duane Steele album) or the title song, 2006
 Ghost Town (Owen album), 2011
 Ghost Town (Poco album) or the title song, 1982
 Ghostown (The Radiators album), 1979
 Ghost Town, by Auryn, 2015

Songs
 "Ghost Town" (Adam Lambert song), 2015
 "Ghost Town" (Benson Boone song), 2021
 "Ghost Town" (Cary Brothers song), 2010
 "Ghost Town" (Cheap Trick song), 1988
 "Ghost Town" (Kanye West song), 2018
 "Ghosttown" (Madonna song), 2015
 "Ghost Town" (Shiny Toy Guns song), 2009
 "Ghost Town" (Specials song), 1981
 "Ghost Town", by the Bicycles from The Good, the Bad and the Cuddly, 2006
 "Ghost Town", by Cat Stevens from Buddha and the Chocolate Box, 1974
 "Ghost Town", by Don Cherry, 1956
 "Ghost Town", by Egypt Central from White Rabbit, 2011
 "Ghost Town", by First Aid Kit from The Big Black and the Blue, 2010
 "Ghost Town", by Gemini from Geminism, 1987
 "Ghost Town", by Jake Owen from Days of Gold, 2013
 "Ghost Town", by Jeff Watson from Around the Sun, 1993
 "Ghost Town", by Katie Melua from Pictures, 2007
 "Ghost Town", by Strung Out from Prototypes and Painkillers, 2009
 "Ghost Town", from the TV series Nashville; see Nashville discography#Season Three, 2014
 "Ghost Towns", by Bob Weir from Blue Mountain, 2016

Other uses
 Ghost Town (video game), a 1981 computer game developed by Adventure International
 Ghost Town, Oakland, California, a district neighborhood
 Ghost Town Village, an abandoned Wild West theme park in Maggie Valley, North Carolina, US
 Ghost Town, a themed area in Knott's Berry Farm, Buena Park, California, US
 Ghosttown, an area in The Great Escape and Hurricane Harbor theme park, Queensbury, New York, US

See also
 
 Ghost city (disambiguation)
 Ghost estate, an unoccupied residential area